Tayyebeh Siavoshi Shah-Enayati is an Iranian reformist politician who is currently a member of the Parliament of Iran representing Tehran, Rey, Shemiranat and Eslamshahr electoral district.

Career 
Siavoshi is an international relations expert in Ministry of Foreign Affairs and Institute for Political and International Studies.

Electoral history

References

1966 births
Living people
People from Tehran
Iranian diplomats
Members of the 10th Islamic Consultative Assembly
Members of the Women's fraction of Islamic Consultative Assembly
University of Tehran alumni
Iranian women diplomats